S. Haijang is a village in the Churachandpur District of Manipur, India.

References

Churachandpur